The 9th Cavalry Brigade was a cavalry brigade of the British Army in World War I.  It was formed in France in 1915 and served on the Western Front as part of the 1st Cavalry Division until the end of the war.

First World War

Formation

9th Cavalry Brigade was formed in France on 14 April 1915 with the 15th Hussars and the 19th Hussars.  These regular cavalry regiments had been serving on the Western Front since August 1914 as divisional cavalry squadrons assigned to infantry divisions.  On the same date, 1/1st Warwickshire Battery, Royal Horse Artillery (TF) (transferred from the 2nd Cavalry Division) and a signal troop joined.

On formation, the brigade was assigned to the 1st Cavalry Division to bring it up to a three brigade standard.  1st Cavalry Division also obtained a third Cavalry Field Ambulance (9th, from England on 23 May) and a third Mobile Veterinary Section (39th, from England on 23 August).

On 12 June, 1/1st Bedfordshire Yeomanry joined from the Eastern Mounted Brigade in England to bring the brigade up to the standard three regiment strength.  On 28 February 1916, a Machine Gun Squadron was formed from the machine gun sections of the brigade's constituent regiments.

Chronicle
With the 1st Cavalry Division, the brigade took part in most of the major actions where cavalry could be used as a mounted mobile force.  At other times it formed a dismounted unit and served in the trenches (as a regiment under the command of the brigadier).  Notable amongst these occasions was on 24–25 March 1918 when, in the Battle of Bapaume, the division formed a "Dismounted Division" under Brigadier-General D'Arcy Legard.

In 1915, it took part in the Second Battle of Ypres and the Battle of Flers–Courcelette in 1916.  1917 saw action at the Battle of Arras and the Battle of Cambrai and in 1918 at the First Battle of the Somme, the Battle of Amiens, the Second Battle of the Somme and the battles of the Hindenburg Line.  It then took part in the Final Advance in Artois and the Final Advance in Picardy.

By the Armistice, the division was north of Mons, about 9 miles east of Ath on the Fifth Army front.  On 16 November 1918, orders were received that the 1st Cavalry Division would lead the advance of the Second Army into Germany.  Moving through Namur, the division crossed the frontier on 1 December and on 7 December the brigade reached the Rhine north of Cologne.  On 12 December, the brigade crossed the Rhine on the Hohenzollern Bridge and reached its position on the perimeter of the bridgehead the next day.

Units

Commanders
The 9th Cavalry Brigade had the following commanders:

See also

British Army during World War I
British cavalry during the First World War

Notes

References

Bibliography

External links
 
 
 
 
 

Cavalry brigades of the British Army
Military units and formations established in 1915
Military units and formations disestablished in 1919